Tomás Ojeda Álvarez (20 April 1910 – 20 February 1983) was a Chilean football attacker. He played in the 1930 World Cup. He played in the Chilean league in Boca Juniors of Antofagasta.

References

External links

Chilean footballers
Chile international footballers
1930 FIFA World Cup players
1910 births
1983 deaths
Association football forwards